Jonathan Jones may refer to:

Sports
Jonathan Jones (American football), American football player
Jonathan Jones (baseball) (born 1989), American baseball player
Jonathan Jones (Canadian football)  (born 1997), Canadian football player
Jonathan Jones (footballer), Welsh footballer for Chester City
Jonathan Jones (runner) (born 1999), Barbadian middle-distance runner
Jonathan C. Jones (born 1976), Barbadian-born Canadian thoroughbred horse-racing jockey

Others
 Jonathan Jones (artist), Indigenous Australian artist
Jonathan Jones (civil servant) (born 1962), British government lawyer
Jonathan Jones (journalist), British journalist and art critic
Jonathan Jones (musician) (born 1982), lead vocalist and keyboardist of We Shot the Moon
Jonathan Jones, British man convicted and then released on appeal for the murders of Harry and Megan Tooze
Jonathan A. Jones (born 1967), British physicist
Jonathan D. G. Jones (born 1954), British molecular biologist
Jo Jones (Jonathan David Samuel Jones, 1911–1985), American jazz drummer

See also
Johnathon Jones (born 1988), American basketball player
Jon Jones (disambiguation)
John Jones (disambiguation)